Kittatinny may refer to:

Places
In New Jersey
Kittatinny Formation, a dolomitic limestone formation
Kittatinny Mountain, a long ridge traversing northwestern New Jersey
Kittatinny Regional High School, in Sussex County
Kittatinny Valley, lies east of the Kittatinny Mountain in western Sussex County
Kittatinny Valley State Park, near Andover

In Pennsylvania
Kittatinny Mountain Tunnel, part of the Pennsylvania Turnpike

Other
USS Kittatinny (1861), a schooner acquired by the Union Navy during the American Civil War